Kalukai (also Romanized as Kalūkāī) is a village in Surak Rural District, Lirdaf District, Jask County, Hormozgan Province, Iran. At the 2006 census, its population was 23, in 6 families.

References 

Populated places in Jask County